Gizmodrome (sometimes known as Copeland, King, Cosma & Belew) is a British-Italian-American rock supergroup formed in Milan, Italy in 2017. The four-piece band consists of Police drummer Stewart Copeland, Level 42 bassist Mark King, Italian keyboardist Vittorio Cosma, and guitarist Adrian Belew who played for Frank Zappa, King Crimson, Talking Heads, David Bowie and many others. The group's debut album, Gizmodrome, was released on September 15, 2017. It was recorded in Milan over two weeks in summer 2016 and spring 2017.

Band members
 Stewart Copeland – vocals, drums, guitar (2017–present)
 Mark King – bass, vocals (2017–present) 
 Vittorio Cosma – keyboards, vocals (2017–present) 
 Adrian Belew – guitar, vocals (2017–present)

Discography

Albums
 Gizmodrome (2017)
Gizmodrome Live (2021)

EPs
Riff Tricks - The Instrumentals Vol. 1 (2017, limited edition to only 1000 copies)

References

External links
Official Website
Gizmodrome on Facebook

Rock music supergroups
Musical groups from London
Musical groups established in 2017
Musical groups from Milan
2017 establishments in Italy